The 2012 RoboCup 2D Soccer Simulation League was a simulated soccer competition contested in the 16th Annual RoboCup International Symposium, held in Mexico City, Mexico, in June 2012.

Format

The first stage was disputed by 18 teams divided into two groups of five teams and two groups of four teams. There were three rounds of groups. In the round 0, the three lowest ranked teams were eliminated. In the round 1, the ten lowest ranked teams were eliminated. Round 2 and 3, four teams of each round were eliminated. The four teams classified from the round 3 disputed the semifinals in two matches for each. The final and 3rd place matches were disputed in a unique game for each.

Round stage

Round 0

Group A

Group B

Group C

Group D

Round 1

Group E

Group F

Round 2

Group G

Group H

Round 3

Group I

Group J

Finals

Honours

See also
 RoboCup
 RoboCup Simulation League
 RoboCup 3D Soccer Simulation League

References
 https://web.archive.org/web/20140729124040/http://newsroom.unsw.edu.au/news/technology/unsw-tops-goal-count-robocup-2012
 https://www.theverge.com/2012/9/7/3287515/robocup-2012-robots-soccer-broken-necks-baby-steps
 http://www.festo-didactic.com/int-en/news/robocup-2012-in-mexico-city-gold-for-germany.htm?fbid=aW50LmVuLjU1Ny4xNy4xNi40Njkx
 https://web.archive.org/web/20140810052442/http://www.oliverobst.eu/research/robocup/rc2012-simleague-2d/
 http://www.robocup2012.org/results/soccer/results_2d/

External links
 RoboCup Soccer Simulator Wiki
 Team Assistant for 3D Visualisation
 Official Data Repository (Log Files, Team Binaries...)

RoboCup
Robot soccer competitions
2012 in robotics